William Henry Brereton Evans (29 January 1883 – 7 August 1913) was a South African-born English first-class cricketer who played 66 times in the early 20th century. An all-rounder, he played county cricket for Worcestershire and Hampshire, as well as representing the Gentlemen against the Players, but he appeared most for Oxford University, whom he represented on 31 occasions. It was said in Wisden in 1914 that he was "one of the best all-round amateurs of his day," and that if he had played more regularly, it was "quite likely" he would have played for England.

Early years
Born in South Africa, the oldest of five children born into a family with a long history in the colonial service in India and South Africa, his grandfather William Evans was Deputy Surgeon General and Inspector General of hospitals in India in the mid-1800s.

W H B Evans attended Malvern College where he joined the cricket team in 1896. He was in the Malvern College First Eleven from 1898 to 1901, being captain in his last year, Wisden states that "he must have been about the best public school cricketer in 1901, as he headed the Malvern batting with an average of 51, and took 53 wickets."

He was at Oriel College, Oxford, from 1901 to 1905 during which time he won his blue for cricket while still a freshman.

A fine all-round sportsman, Evans also distinguished himself at football, playing for Malvern's First Eleven and Association Football, representing Oxford First Eleven for three seasons from 1902 where he played with another Old Malvernian, James Balfour-Melville. In company with B. S. Foster, he also won the Public School Racquets Championship in 1900.

Cricket debut

He made his first-class debut for Worcestershire against Sussex in 1901 and took two wickets, his first victim being C. B. Fry. Evans' second-innings 53 also proved important, as the game ended in a draw with Worcestershire nine wickets down.

In five further matches for the county he took only one more wicket, but he scored 107 against Gloucestershire at the end of August. Worcestershire's 342-run victory in that game remains (as of April 2007) their largest ever in terms of runs.

In 1902 Evans played mostly for Oxford, hitting his career best of 142 against Sussex in June, but he also appeared several times for his new county of Hampshire. In all he made 609 first-class runs at 29.00 and took 18 wickets at 28.44.

The following season his batting was less productive (he averaged only 19 and did not score a century) but he took 50 wickets, his highest season's aggregate, at 18.08, including hauls for Oxford of 7–41 (his career best) against Somerset and 7–43 against Marylebone Cricket Club (MCC). He also made the first of his five appearances in Gentlemen v Players matches.

1904, when he captained Oxford, was Evans' best season with the bat, as in 19 innings he hit 861 runs at 47.83 including two hundreds and seven fifties. He took 34 wickets at a shade under 32 runs apiece, and returned nearly identical figures the following season, although this time his batting was slightly less productive.

Later career
On leaving Oxford in 1905 Evans joined the Egyptian Civil Service which resulted in fewer opportunities to play first-class cricket, and causing him to miss the next three seasons. Had he continued, Wisden considered it "quite likely that he would have had the distinction of playing for England."  He made something of a return to the game in 1909, still with Hampshire, and claimed 32 first-class wickets at 18.59, including figures of 7–59 for his county against Gloucestershire (his batting was less good: 360 runs at 24). He played twice for the Gentlemen in July, but was then absent for more than a year, returning only at the end of the 1910 season for two final County Championship matches, in which he could manage only 55 runs and four wickets in total. This marked the end of Evans' first-class career.

Death

He died on Laffans Plain near Aldershot in Hampshire in a flying accident, aged only 30. On 7 August 1913 he was a passenger of Samuel Franklin Cody when he was test flying his latest design, the Cody Floatplane, when it broke up at 200 ft (60m) and he and Cody were both killed as they were thrown from the wreckage; neither Cody or Williams were strapped in, and experts at the time surmised that if they had been, both men might have survived. Cody's stepson Leon King had given up his place on the flight to Evans.

His funeral was held on 13 August 1913 at St Peter's Church in Tadley in Hampshire. Large crowds attended, drawn there because of the tragic circumstances of his death. His body had been cremated, an unusual choice at that time, but perhaps due to the horrific injuries his body had received during the flying accident. The casket containing his ashes was buried in a grave beside that of his grandmother, Emma Evans, who had died in 1911. Leon King, Cody's stepson, was among the mourners, as were Evans's family and friends. The prayers of committal were read by the Rev L.P. Phelps, from Oriel College, Oxford, which Evans had left only eight years before.

A number of his relatives played cricket to a high standard. His cousin John Evans played one Test for England; while his brothers Alfred and Dudley, another cousin Ralph and his uncle Alfred Henry Evans all played for Hampshire.

References

External links
 

1883 births
1913 deaths
English cricketers
Hampshire cricketers
People educated at Malvern College
Alumni of Oriel College, Oxford
Worcestershire cricketers
Oxford University cricketers
Marylebone Cricket Club cricketers
Gentlemen cricketers
Victims of aviation accidents or incidents in England
Victims of aviation accidents or incidents in 1913
Gentlemen of England cricketers
C. I. Thornton's XI cricketers